Not for Church Folk! is a 2001 album by Millie Jackson, after just over a decade of no studio albums.

Track listing
"Butt-A-Cize" (Doug Smith, Tyrone Holmes, Millie Jackson)
"Leave Me Alone"
"In My Life" feat. Da Brat (Tyrone Holmes, Millie Jackson)
"Girl Gotta Know (She's a Ho)" (Douglas Knyght, Millie Jackson)
"Night Dance" (Tyrone Holmes, Bryan Michael)
"Trying 2 Get U Back" (Doug Smith, Millie Jackson)
"OMF" (Doug Smith, Millie Jackson)
"Water, Water" (Flo Kennedy, Joy Kennedy)
"OB, Got It Going On" (Ty Max, Millie Jackson)
"I'm Fifty" (Ty Max, Millie Jackson)
"I'm Fifty (Reprise)" (Tyrone Holmes, Millie Jackson)
"Butt-A Cize" (Remix) (Doug Smith, Ty Max, Millie Jackson)
"Caught in a Trap" (Douglas Knyght)

2001 albums
Millie Jackson albums